Father and Son (1907) is a memoir, initially published anonymously in both England and America, by poet and critic Edmund Gosse, subtitled "a study of two temperaments". 
A biography of his father
appeared under Edmund's name in 1890.
The book describes Edmund's early years in an exceptionally devout Plymouth Brethren home.  His mother, Emily Gosse, who died at the age of 50 of breast cancer, was a writer of Christian tracts.  His father, Philip Henry Gosse, was an influential, largely self-taught, invertebrate zoologist and student of marine biology who, after his wife's death, took Edmund to live in Devon. The book focuses on the relationship between a stern, religious father who rejects the new evolutionary theories of his scientific colleague Charles Darwin and the son's gradual coming of age and rejection of his father's fundamentalist religion. Although Gosse used pseudonyms throughout the book, the identities of many of the people depicted are now known.

Michael Newton, Lecturer in English, University College London, has called the book "a brilliant, and often comic, record of the small diplomacies of home: those indirections, omissions, insincerities, and secrecies that underlie family relationships."  "[B]rilliantly written, and full of gentle wit," the book is "an unmatched social document, preserving for us whole the experience of childhood in a Protestant sect in the Victorian period....Above all, it is one of our best accounts of adolescence, particularly for those who endured...a religious upbringing." Literary critic Vivian Gornick has described the book as an early example of the modern memoir of "becoming", in which "What happened to the writer is not what matters; what matters is the large sense that the writer is able to make of what happened." 

Although Edmund Gosse prefaces the book with the claim that the incidents described are sober reality, a modern biography of Philip Henry Gosse by Ann Thwaite presents him not as a repressive tyrant who cruelly scrutinized the state of his son's soul but as a gentle and thoughtful person of "delicacy and inner warmth", much unlike his son's portrait.  Biographer and critic D. J. Taylor described Gosse's own portrayal of his father as "horribly partial" and noted that, in Thwaite's work, "the supposedly sequestered, melancholic pattern of [Edmund] Gosse's London and Devonshire childhood is repeatedly proved to have contained great affection, friends, fun and even light reading."

Editions
Gosse made fifty changes to the text of Father and Son, most of which were minor but some corrected errors of fact. A bibliographical description of the editions and issues of the book (sixty-two in all) includes information on translations into Arabic, French, German, Italian, Japanese (partial), Spanish and Swedish. 

Source: Library of Congress
New York, C. Scribner's sons, 1907
London, W. Heinemann, 1907
New York, Oxford University Press [1934]
London : Heinemann, 1958
Boston, Houghton Mifflin, [1965, c1907]
London, Heinemann Educational, 1970, 
London ; New York : Oxford University Press, 1974, 
Oxford [England] ; New York : Oxford University Press, 2004,

In popular culture
Father and Son partially inspired the 1988 novel Oscar and Lucinda by Peter Carey, that won the Booker Prize the same year, and the 1989 Miles Franklin Award.

The book was the inspiration for Dennis Potter's 1976 television drama Where Adam Stood, starring Alan Badel as Philip Gosse.

References

External links

 

1907 non-fiction books
Literary autobiographies
Plymouth Brethren
British autobiographies